Dobrá Voda is a municipality of Trnava District in the Trnava region of Slovakia.

Cultural sites
A Roman Catholic church from 1820 and a Holy Trinity chapel from 1730 are located in the village.

The ruins of the Dobrá Voda castle are located in the Little Carpathians in Dobrá Voda.

Notable people
The most important poet of the Bernolák's group. Ján Hollý, lived and worked during the last years of his life (1843–1849) in Dobrá Voda.

Earthquakes
The village of Dobrá Voda was the siesmologically most active region of Slovakia in the 20th century. In 1906 this resulted in the heaviest earthquake of that century in Slovakia happening in this region.

See also
 List of municipalities and towns in Slovakia

References

External links

https://web.archive.org/web/20071116010355/http://www.statistics.sk/mosmis/eng/run.html
Surnames of living people in Dobra Voda

Villages and municipalities in Trnava District